Mahmud Muzaffar Shah (born 1823, Terengganu — died July 1864, Pahang), third Sultan of Riau-Lingga Sultanate (archipelagoes south of Singapore), whose deposition cleared the way for Dutch colonial control.

Mahmud was crowned Sultan in 1834, and when the regency of his father, Sultan Muhammad II Muazzam Shah ended in 1841, he resolved to restore the power wielded by his predecessors. He had the tacit support of the east coast Malay states to the north and particularly of Sultan Omar Riayat Shah of Terengganu. Mahmud’s claim to the throne of the Malay state of Pahang seemed threatening to the Dutch, however, and they deposed him in October 1857. Mahmud retained immense prestige among east coast Malays, and his efforts to win Malay and Thai support for his Pahang claim, although fruitless, provided occasions for further Dutch and British involvement in Malay affairs.

Sources

1823 births
1864 deaths

Sultans of Johor
House of Bendahara of Johor